Lower Kinnerton is a former civil parish, now in the parish of Dodleston, in Cheshire West and Chester, England. It contains six buildings that are recorded in the National Heritage List for England as designated listed buildings, all of which are at Grade II. This grade is the lowest of the three gradings given to listed buildings and is applied to "buildings of national importance and special interest". Apart from the village of Lower Kinnerton, the parish is entirely rural. Other than the former school and schoolmaster's house, all the listed buildings are related to farming.

See also

Listed buildings in Dodleston

Listed buildings in Poulton
Listed buildings in Pulford

References
Citations

Sources

Listed buildings in Cheshire West and Chester
Lists of listed buildings in Cheshire